Vijayakanth Viyaskanth (born 5 December 2001) is a Sri Lankan cricketer. He is a talented leg spinner, who plays for the Jaffna Kings in the Lanka Premier League. He made his Twenty20 debut on 4 December 2020, for the Jaffna Stallions in the 2020 Lanka Premier League. In November 2021, he was selected to play for the Jaffna Kings following the players' draft for the 2021 Lanka Premier League. 

He made his List A debut on 30 January 2022, for the Team Jaffna in the 2021–22 SLC National Super League. In July 2022, he was signed by the Jaffna Kings for the third edition of the Lanka Premier League. He was one of the leading wicket takers in the tournament, taking 13 wickets. In December 2022, he was picked by the Chattogram Challengers for the ninth season of the Bangladesh Premier League.

References

External links
 

2001 births
Living people
Sri Lankan cricketers
Jaffna Kings cricketers
People from Jaffna
Sri Lankan Tamil sportspeople